Yunbai is a form of heightened speech used in Beijing opera and Kunqu.  It utilizes a local dialect typical of central China, with a sing-song and rhythmic quality.

See also
Beijing opera

References

External links
Beijing opera page

Peking opera
Chinese opera